The Lafa–Harbin railway, named the Labin Railway, is a  single-track trunk railway in Northeast China, running from Lafa to Binjiang via Harbin. It connects to the Changtu Railway at Lafa, to the Jishu Railway and the Taoshu Railway at Shulan, to the Binsui Railway and the Hahuan Line at Xiangfang, and at Harbin to the Binbei Railway, the Binzhou Railway, and the Jingha Railway.

History
The line, originally named the Labin Line (Rōhin Line in Japanese), was built by the Manchukuo National Railway between 1932 and 1934, and officially opened on 1 September 1934. The Harbin–Binjiang section was originally built by the North Manchuria Railway, and whilst under the management of the Manchukuo National Railway it was part of the Binjiang Line. After the Soviet invasion of Manchuria in 1945 it was taken over by the Soviet Army, and from then until 1955 it was operated by the Sino-Soviet China Changchun Railway. After 1955 it was merged into China Railway and renamed Labin Railway, and is now jointly administered by the Harbin and Shenyang Railway Bureaux.

Route

References

Railway lines in China
Rail transport in Heilongjiang
Rail transport in Jilin
Railway lines in Manchukuo
Railway lines opened in 1934
1934 establishments in China